Chana Franciela Masson de Souza (born 18 December 1978 in Capinzal) is a Brazilian handball goalkeeper, who plays for Handball Erice in Italy. She has represented the Brazilian national team in four Olympics. She participated at the 2000 Summer Olympics in Sydney, at the 2004 Summer Olympics in Athens, the 2008 Summer Olympics in Beijing and the 2012 Summer Olympics in London.

Awards and recognition
All-Star Goalkeeper of the World Championship: 2011
Norwegian Cup:
Finalist: 2018

References

External links
 Profile on Randers HK official website
 
 
 

1978 births
Living people
Brazilian female handball players
Olympic handball players of Brazil
Handball players at the 2000 Summer Olympics
Handball players at the 2004 Summer Olympics
Handball players at the 2008 Summer Olympics
Handball players at the 2012 Summer Olympics
Pan American Games medalists in handball
Pan American Games gold medalists for Brazil
Handball players at the 2007 Pan American Games
Expatriate handball players
Brazilian expatriate sportspeople in Denmark
Brazilian expatriate sportspeople in Germany
Brazilian expatriate sportspeople in Norway
Brazilian expatriate sportspeople in Spain
Medalists at the 2007 Pan American Games
Medalists at the 2011 Pan American Games
20th-century Brazilian women
21st-century Brazilian women